The New Zealand national cricket team was due to tour Pakistan in September to October 2001 but the tour was cancelled for security reasons in the wake of the World Trade Center & The Pentagon attacks on 11 September 2001. Three Tests had been scheduled at Arbab Niaz Stadium, Peshawar; Iqbal Stadium, Faisalabad; and the National Stadium, Karachi. Instead, New Zealand visited Pakistan in April to May 2002 and played a two-match Test series against the Pakistani national cricket team, but the tour was cut short following 2002 Karachi bus bombing. Pakistan won the Test series 1–0. New Zealand were captained by Stephen Fleming and Pakistan by Waqar Younis. In addition, the teams played a three-match Limited Overs International (LOI) series which Pakistan won 3–0.

One Day Internationals (ODIs)

Pakistan won the series 3-0.

1st ODI

2nd ODI

3rd ODI

Test series summary

1st Test

2nd Test

References

External links
 

2002 in New Zealand cricket
2002 in Pakistani cricket
New Zealand cricket tours of Pakistan
International cricket competitions in 2002
Pakistani cricket seasons from 2000–01
Cricket tours abandoned due to terrorism